Denise Lynne Campbell (born July 14, 1964) is an American politician and a Democratic member of the West Virginia House of Delegates who has been representing District 43 since January 12, 2013. Campbell served consecutively from January 2011 until January 2013 in a District 37 seat.

Education
Campbell earned her associate degree in nursing from Davis & Elkins College, her BSN from Alderson Broaddus College (now Alderson Broaddus University), and her MA in administration from Marshall University.

Elections
2012 – Redistricted to District 43 alongside fellow District 37 incumbent William Hartman, Campbell ran in the three-way May 8, 2012 Democratic Primary and placed first with 4,255 votes (41.5%), and placed first in the three-way two-position November 6, 2012 General election with 8,729 votes (41.2%) ahead of fellow Democratic Representative Hartman and Republican nominee Donna Auvil.
2010 – When District 37 Democratic Representative Bill Proudfoot retired and left a seat open, Campbell ran in the six-way May 11, 2010 Democratic Primary and placed second with 1,846 votes (22.3%), and placed first in the three-way two-position November 2, 2010 General election with 6,328 votes (35.8%) ahead of incumbent Representative Hartman and Republican nominee Wilda Sharp, who had run for the seat in 2006.

References

External links
Official page at the West Virginia Legislature

Denise Campbell at Ballotpedia
Denise L. Campbell at OpenSecrets

Place of birth missing (living people)
1964 births
Living people
Alderson Broaddus University alumni
American nurses
American women nurses
Davis & Elkins College alumni
Marshall University alumni
Democratic Party members of the West Virginia House of Delegates
People from Elkins, West Virginia
Women state legislators in West Virginia
21st-century American politicians
21st-century American women politicians